Royal visits to New Zealand by members of the Royal Family have been taking place since 1869. The first member of the Royal Family to visit New Zealand was Prince Alfred, Duke of Edinburgh. Subsequently, there have been over 50 visits. The first reigning monarch of New Zealand to visit the country was Elizabeth II in 1953–54. In all, she visited New Zealand on 10 occasions, most recently in 2002.

Before 1900
 1869: Prince Alfred, Duke of Edinburgh
 1870: Prince Alfred, Duke of Edinburgh
 1871: Prince Alfred, Duke of Edinburgh

1901–1950
 1901: Duke and Duchess of Cornwall and York
 1920: Edward, Prince of Wales
 1927: Duke and Duchess of York
 1934–1935: Prince Henry, Duke of Gloucester

1951–2000
 23 December 1953 – 31 January 1954: Elizabeth II and the Duke of Edinburgh
 1956: Duke of Edinburgh
 1958: Queen Elizabeth The Queen Mother
 6–18 February 1963: Elizabeth II and the Duke of Edinburgh
 1966: Queen Elizabeth The Queen Mother
 1968: Duke of Edinburgh
 12–30 March 1970: Elizabeth II, the Duke of Edinburgh, Charles, Prince of Wales, and Princess Anne
 18–29 April 1971: Princess Alexandra and Angus Ogilvy
 10–14 October 1973: Duke of Edinburgh
 1974
 22 January – 6 February: Elizabeth II, the Duke of Edinburgh, Charles, Prince of Wales, and Princess Anne
 4–5 September: Charles, Prince of Wales
 22 February – 7 March 1977: Elizabeth II and the Duke of Edinburgh
 1980: Duke and Duchess of Kent
 1981
 31 March – 12 April: Charles, Prince of Wales
 12–20 October: Elizabeth II and the Duke of Edinburgh
 1982–1983: Prince Edward
 1983
 17–30 April: Prince and Princess of Wales, Prince William
 Prince Edward
 1985: Duke and Duchess of Gloucester
 1986
 22 February – 2 March: Elizabeth II and the Duke of Edinburgh
 Prince Edward
 1990: Elizabeth II, the Duke of Edinburgh, and Prince Edward
 5–10 February 1994: Charles, Prince of Wales
 1995
 1–10 November: Elizabeth II and the Duke of Edinburgh
 Anne, Princess Royal
 1997: Duke of Edinburgh and Prince Edward
 1998: Prince Andrew, Duke of York
 1999: Anne, Princess Royal

2001–present
 2002
 Anne, Princess Royal
 22–27 February: Elizabeth II and the Duke of Edinburgh
 2003: Anne, Princess Royal
 2004: Prince Edward, Earl of Wessex
 2005
 5–10 March: Charles, Prince of Wales
 30 June – 10 July: Prince William
 29 September – 2 October: Prince Andrew, Duke of Yorkl
 9–12 July 2006: Anne, Princess Royal
 2007: Prince Andrew, Duke of York
 2008: Anne, Princess Royal
 2009: Prince Edward, Earl of Wessex
 2010
 Prince William
 Prince Richard, Duke of Gloucester
 2011: Prince William
 10–16 November 2012: Charles, Prince of Wales and the Duchess of Cornwall
 2014: Duke and Duchess of Cambridge, Prince George
 2015
 9–16 May: Prince Harry
 4–9 November: Charles, Prince of Wales and the Duchess of Cornwall
 2018: Duke and Duchess of Sussex
 2019
 Prince William, Duke of Cambridge
 17–23 November: Charles, Prince of Wales and the Duchess of Cornwall

Attack on Royalty
In 1981 Queen Elizabeth II and other Royals were visiting New Zealand. When the queen was outside the Otago Museum in Dunedin, she was shot at by Christopher John Lewis while he was hiding in a room upstairs. He missed and he was later arrested.

See also
List of Commonwealth visits made by Elizabeth II

Notes

References

 
 
 
 
 
 
 
 
 
 
 
 
 
 
 
 
 
 
 
 
 
 
 
 
 
 
 
 
 
 
 

New Zealand
Monarchy in New Zealand